Mount Batu Brinchang is the highest mountain in the Cameron Highlands area that can be accessed by car. It is situated at the Perak-Pahang border in Malaysia. It is one of the mountains in Malaysia where its summit can be reached by road. Due to easy accessibility, this mountain enjoys many visitors all year round.

Features
This mountain enjoys an easy road access all the way to the summit. In fact, the road leading to the summit of this mountain is also the highest road in Peninsular Malaysia.

There is also a micro-station installation at the top of this mountain.

The observation tower at the summit enables tourists to enjoy the panoramic view of Titiwangsa Mountains from the summit.

Hiking routes
Obviously the easiest way to reach the summit of this mountain is via road. But as the road winds around the mountain, it is also time-consuming. To follow this road from the nearest town, Brinchang, it will take 12 km walk for around 3 hours. One may also hire a taxi from Brinchang to get to the summit which will then follow this road.

For the more adventurous, one may also try nature trail path that cuts the forest all the way up to the summit. The nature trail's entrance is situated at the edge of the Brinchang town itself.

External links
Gunung Brinchang at Gunung Online

Batu Brinchang